Stung Sen Dam is a proposed multipurpose dam to be located on the Stung Sen River. The river originates in Preah Vihear and flows to the Tonlé Sap Lake in Kompong Thom, southeast of Phnom Rovieng, Cambodia.  Under MoU study project and Feasibility Study by Korean company.  The large reservoir would submerge Kompong Putrea. Exact data for reservoir size and number of displaced people is not available, nor is any information on the importance of the Stung Sen's flow to the Tonle Sap Lake or fisheries.

The Cambodian government planned to have many dams on the Tonle Sap and the Mekong tributary. Tonle Sap Lake is the largest fresh water body in Cambodia and serves as a buffer in the Mekong River system for flood mitigation and is the source of beneficial dry season flows. The Tonle Sap River drains the Tonle Sap Lake from the northwest before it continues further southeastward to its lower delta in Vietnam.

Status: The project is listed as "second phase" priority by the CNMC.: The Stung Sen Dam is to be constructed after the Prek Thnot, Stung Battambang, and Stung Chinit dams.

See also

 Mekong
 Mekong River Commission

References

Dams in the Mekong River Basin
Proposed hydroelectric power stations
Hydroelectric power stations in Cambodia
Dams in Cambodia
Kampong Thom province
Proposed renewable energy power stations in Cambodia